The 2020–21 season was Chelsea Women's 29th competitive season and 11th consecutive season in the FA Women's Super League, the top flight of English women's football.

Squad information

First team squad

New contracts

Transfers and loans

In

Out

Loan out

Management team

{|class="wikitable"
|-
!Position
!Staff
|-
|Manager|| Emma Hayes
|-
|Assistant manager|| Paul Green
|-
|Assistant coach|| Denise Reddy
|-
|Head of technical/Goalkeeping coach|| Stuart Searle
|-
|Head of performance|| Bart Caubergh
|-
|Opposition analyst & coach || Leanne Champ
|-

Non-competitive

Pre-season

Competitions

Community Shield 

In August 2020, the FA announced the return of the Women's FA Community Shield for the first time since 2008. The tie was contested between 2019–20 FA WSL champions Chelsea and Manchester City, who qualified as reigning 2019 FA Cup winners due to the unfinished nature of the 2019–20 Women's FA Cup. The match was part of a Wembley double-header on the same day as the men's equivalent.

Women's Super League

League table

Results summary

Results by matchday

Matches

FA Cup

League Cup

Group B

Knockout phase

Champions League

Round of 32

Round of 16 

Note: Location moved to Italy because of travel restrictions due to Covid-19.

Quarter-finals 

Note: Location for both legs moved to Budapest because of travel restrictions due to the COVID-19 pandemic.

Semi-finals

Final

Statistics

Appearances and goals

|-
|colspan="16"|Goalkeepers:
|-

|-
|colspan="16"|Defenders:
|-

|-
|colspan="16"|Midfielders:
|-

|-
|colspan="16"|Forwards:
|-

|-
|colspan="16"|Players have left the club:
|-

|-

Goalscorers
Includes all competitive matches. The list is sorted by squad number when total goals are equal.

Assists
Includes all competitive matches. The list is sorted by squad number when total assists are equal.

Clean sheets
Includes all competitive matches. The list is sorted by squad number when total clean sheets are equal.

Disciplinary records
Includes all competitive matches. The list is sorted by squad number when total disciplinary records are equal.

Awards

Notes

References

Chelsea F.C. Women seasons